Rudi, Behave! is a 1971 West German comedy film directed by Franz Josef Gottlieb and starring Rudi Carrell, Chris Roberts and Heidi Hansen.

It was partly shot at Lake Wörthersee in the Austrian state of Carinthia.

Cast
 Rudi Carrell as Rudi Carnel
 Chris Roberts as Chris
 Heidi Hansen as Doris
 Ernst H. Hilbich as Friedrich Schiller
 Angelica Ott as Andrea
 Hans Kraus as Hansi
 Doris Kirchner as Olga
 Hans Terofal as Balduin
 Lotte Ledl as Luise Schiller
 Raoul Retzer as Pförtner
 Pit Krüger as Oskar
 Myriam Dreifuss as Frau mit Baby
 Heinz Eckner as Rezeptionist Schlosshotel
 Gunther Philipp as Sebastian Hill
 Hans Waldherr as Iwan
 Georg Bucher as Gepäckträger vom Schlosshotel
 Anita Hegerland as Anita - Rudis Nichte

References

Bibliography 
 Manfred Hobsch. Liebe, Tanz und 1000 Schlagerfilme. Schwarzkopf & Schwarzkopf, 1998.

External links 
 

1971 films
1971 comedy films
German comedy films
West German films
1970s German-language films
Films directed by Franz Josef Gottlieb
Films scored by Gerhard Heinz
Constantin Film films
1970s German films